Adelabad may refer to:

Adelabad, Chaharmahal and Bakhtiari
Adelabad, Lorestan
Adelabad, alternate name of Adlabad, Lorestan
Adelabad, Razavi Khorasan
Adelabad, Sistan and Baluchestan

See also
Adlabad (disambiguation)